Abellana National School (ANS) is located in Cebu City, Philippines. It is a public high school established in the year 1902.

History
 Abellana National School is situated at Osmeña Boulevard, Barangay Sambag II in Cebu City. It was formerly the Cebu State College of Science and Technology (CSCST) - College of Arts and Trades. On June 10, 1983, it was converted into an extension campus of the CSCST by the passage of Batasang Pambansa Bilang 412, now already known as Abellana National School

The school was the first Provincial High School, organized under the authority of Act. No. 372 of the Philippine Commission passed March 6, 1902, and the high school was formally organized in Cebu in 1906. The school at that time offered a purely academic curriculum and it operated until the outbreak of World War II.

In 1945, the Provincial High School was transferred to Argao, Cebu, and the City of Cebu established the City High School in the buildings vacated by the Provincial High School.

The City High School had been named Abellana High School in honor of the great Cebuano hero, the late Governor of Cebu, Hon. Hilario Abellana who was killed by the Japanese during their occupation in Cebu. Then it was changed to Abellana Technical School and later to Abellana Vocational High School.

Since 1993, the school has been named Abellana National School by the virtue of the RA 3027 passed by Congressman Osmeña. It was the same act that authorized the offerings of both Trade and General Curriculum, a comprehensive high school that is an ongoing program at present. In the school year 2018–2019, the number of students was 5,228. The very first principal in the school was the late Mr. Valiente Cruz. While currently the school principal is Mr. Nathanael M. Flores.

References

External links 
 Abellana National School web site

Schools in Cebu City
High schools in Cebu
Educational institutions established in 1906
1906 establishments in the Philippines
Public schools in the Philippines